Neil R. Eisenhut (born February 9, 1967) is a Canadian retired professional ice hockey player who spent parts of two seasons in the National Hockey League in the mid-1990s.

Eisenhut was born in Osoyoos, British Columbia. He was selected 233rd overall in the 1987 NHL Entry Draft by the Vancouver Canucks, following which he spent four seasons at the University of North Dakota. At North Dakota, he played alongside a slew of fellow Canuck draft picks (Dixon Ward, Dane Jackson, Garry Valk, and Jason Herter) who would also be future teammates in pro hockey.

Turning pro in 1991, Eisenhut was assigned to the Milwaukee Admirals of the IHL. He would toil in the minors in Vancouver's system for the next three years, earning a positive reputation for his character and leadership, and serving as captain of the Hamilton Canucks. In 1992–93, he had his best minor-league season, recording 22 goals and 40 assists for 62 points with Hamilton. In 1993–94, he finally received a taste of NHL action, recording a goal and 4 points in a 13-game callup to the Canucks.

Eisenhut signed as a free agent with the Calgary Flames for the 1994–95 season, and had another brief NHL stint, appearing in three games for the Flames. After spending two more years in the AHL, primarily with the Binghamton Rangers, Eisenhut signed in Germany in 1997. He would spend a successful six seasons in the DEL with the Krefeld Penguins and DEG Metro Stars before retiring in 2003.

Following his retirement, Eisenhut became a financial advisor, and currently works in that position for RBC in Kelowna, BC. He also continued to play senior amateur hockey, helping the Powell River Regals to the Allan Cup in 2006.

Career statistics

Regular season and playoffs

Awards and honors

References

External links

1967 births
Binghamton Rangers players
Calgary Flames players
Düsseldorfer EG players
Flint Generals (CoHL) players
Hamilton Canucks players
Ice hockey people from British Columbia
Krefeld Pinguine players
Langley Eagles players
Living people
Merritt Centennials players
Milwaukee Admirals (IHL) players
Orlando Solar Bears (IHL) players
Penticton Knights players
People from Osoyoos
Saint John Flames players
North Dakota Fighting Hawks men's ice hockey players
Vancouver Canucks draft picks
Vancouver Canucks players
Canadian ice hockey centres